In the Mood was a Canadian music variety television series which aired on CBC Television from 1971 to 1972.

Premise
Big band styles of music were featured in this variety series hosted by Jack Duffy. The series regular band was led by Guido Basso. Episodes featured guest musicians and a particular theme, such as the debut which featured Glenn Miller's brand of music and guests Tex Beneke and The Modernaires.

Scheduling
This half-hour series was broadcast on Thursday evenings from 16 September 1971 to 29 June 1972. The initial time slot was 9:00 p.m. (Eastern) until January 1972 when it moved to 7:30 p.m. for the remainder of the series (except for two 9 p.m. broadcasts for the first two weeks of April 1972).

Episodes were repeated from 13 July to 14 September 1974 on Saturday nights at 10:30 p.m.

References

External links

 
 

CBC Television original programming
1971 Canadian television series debuts
1972 Canadian television series endings
1970s Canadian variety television series
1970s Canadian music television series